Tuscarora is a hamlet and census-designated place in the town of Mount Morris, Livingston County, New York, United States. Its population was 74 as of the 2010 census.

Geography
Tuscarora is in southwestern Livingston County, in the southeast part of the town of Mount Morris. It is in the valley of Keshequa Creek, a northeast-flowing tributary of Canaseraga Creek and part of the Genesee River watershed.

The First Presbyterian Church of Tuscarora, built circa 1844, is a historic church in the center of the hamlet. It is the last surviving public building from Tuscarora's brief early to mid-19th century commercial prosperity related to its location on the Genesee Valley Canal.

Demographics

References

Hamlets in Livingston County, New York
Hamlets in New York (state)
Census-designated places in Livingston County, New York
Census-designated places in New York (state)